Nina Hyams (born 1952) is a distinguished research professor emeritus in linguistics at the University of California in Los Angeles.

Education and career 
Hyams received her PhD in linguistics in 1983 from CUNY, with a dissertation entitled, The acquisition of parameterized grammars. It was published by Springer in 1986, and it remains a widely cited and influential classic.

Her primary research area since her dissertation is grammatical development in first language acquisition.  She is particularly noted for her research into the acquisition of null subjects.

In 2020 she was inducted as a Fellow in the Linguistic Society of America.

Selected publications

Hyams, Nina; "The Theory of Parameters and Syntactic Development", a chapter within

References

External links

1952 births
Living people
Linguists from the United States
20th-century linguists
University of California, Los Angeles faculty
Women cognitive scientists
Developmental psycholinguists
Women linguists
City University of New York alumni
Fellows of the Linguistic Society of America